Mathildidae is a family of minute sea snails, marine gastropod molluscs in the superfamily Mathildoidea  of the informal group of the Lower Heterobranchia.

Genera
Genera within the family Mathildidae include:
 Brookesena Finlay, 1926
 Mathilda Semper, 1865
 Tuba Lea, 1833
 Turritellopsis G. O. Sars, 1878
Genera brought into synonymy
 Eucharilda Iredale, 1929: synonym of Mathilda Semper, 1865
 Fimbriatella Sacco, 1895: synonym of Mathilda Semper, 1865
 Gegania Jeffreys, 1884: synonym of Tuba Lea, 1833
 Granulicharilda Kuroda & Habe in Kuroda, Habe & Oyama, 1971: synonym of Mathilda Semper, 1865
 Mathildona Iredale, 1929: synonym of Mathilda Semper, 1865
 Opimilda Iredale, 1929: synonym of Mathilda Semper, 1865

References

 Rudiger Bieler, Mathildidae from New Caledonia and the Loyalty Islands (Gastropoda: Heterobranchia); 1995, Mémoires du Museum national d'Histoire naturelle, Paris
 Jensen, R. H. (1997). A Checklist and Bibliography of the Marine Molluscs of Bermuda. Unp. , 547 pp

External links
 
 Powell A. W. B., New Zealand Mollusca, William Collins Publishers Ltd, Auckland, New Zealand 1979